Chodów  is a village in Koło County, Greater Poland Voivodeship, in west-central Poland. It is the seat of the gmina (administrative district) called Gmina Chodów.

The village has a population of 830.

References

Villages in Koło County